The Citizens Theatre, in what was the Royal Princess's Theatre, is the creation of James Bridie and is based in Glasgow, Scotland as a principal producing theatre. The theatre includes a 500-seat Main Auditorium, and has also included various studio theatres over time.

The Citizens' Theatre repertory was founded in 1943 by dramatist and screenwriter James Bridie, author of some 40 plays presented in Britain and overseas,
art gallery director Tom Honeyman, 
cinema impresario George Singleton, known by many as "Mr Cosmo", whose headquarter cinema continues today as the Glasgow Film Theatre, and Paul Vincent Carroll, whose plays were first performed at the Abbey Theatre, Dublin (founder W.B.Yeats) and later on Broadway, winning the New York Drama Critics' Circle award for Shadow and Substance (1938) and The White Steed (1939).

Under the leadership of James Bridie  (Dr O.H. Mavor), the Citizens Company was based at first in the Glasgow Athenaeum. It moved in 1945 to its present site, the then Royal Princess's Theatre (opened 1878), where the building became the Citizens Theatre.

Background
The Citizens Theatre is based in the Gorbals area of Glasgow, Scotland and produces a breadth of work, from professional productions for its main auditorium and studio spaces through to an ongoing commitment to creative learning and engaging with the community.

While the Citizens Theatre building retains some of the original Victorian architectural features, it has undergone additional renovations and expansions over the years. It now includes the 500-seat main auditorium, and two studio theatres. The main auditorium contains the original (1878) proscenium arch stage, which is raked (slopes down towards the auditorium); it has three seating levels: the stalls, the dress circle and the upper circle (or "gods"). The building contains the oldest original (1878) working understage machinery and paint frame in a working theatre in the United Kingdom. The paint frame is still used for scenic painting and its original glass roof remains.

As part of the theatre's ongoing commitment to remain accessible, the Citizens endeavours to keep tickets reasonably priced. In 2008 over 900 children from the Gorbals and surrounding schools participated in a free workshop in their school and attended performances of The Wizard of Oz at the subsidised ticket price of £2.

The Citizens Theatre announced on 18 February 2013 that architects Bennetts Associates has been selected to work on the plans for the most comprehensive redevelopment of the building since it opened as a theatre in 1878. "Citizens Theatre Redevelopment" Contract work is now underway with an opening expected in 2022.

Citizens Theatre and TAG
The Citizens Theatre and TAG Theatre Company came together as one company in April 2007. Together, the new company offered a substantial programme of work each year, from professional productions on the Citizens stages to participatory work with people of all ages, backgrounds and cultures.  TAG encompassed all of the work for children and young people. Citizens Learning focused on developing links between the Citizens Theatre and people of all ages living and working in Glasgow and the surrounding area, by encouraging them to engage with the theatre's work and participate in drama.

Artistic directors

Dominic Hill (2011-present)
Dominic Hill was Artistic Director at the Traverse Theatre, Edinburgh for the last 3 years. Prior to the Traverse, he was Co-Artistic Director (with James Brining) at Dundee Rep Theatre, a post he held for 5 years from 2003. Before joining Dundee Rep, Dominic worked as a Freelance Director, Associate Director at Orange Tree Theatre, Richmond, Assistant Director at the Royal Shakespeare Company and Assistant Director at Perth Theatre. He has received many accolades for his critically acclaimed productions, including numerous CATS Awards (Critics Awards for Theatre in Scotland) for amongst others, The Dark Things (Best Production 2009/10); Peer Gynt (Best Director & Best Production 2007/08); and Scenes from an Execution (Best Director 2003/04). Hill took up post in October 2011.

Guy Hollands (2006-2011)
Guy Hollands became Artistic Director of the Citizens Theatre in 2006, having previously been Artistic Director of TAG since 2004. After four successful years, Hollands is expected to assume a new role leading the Citizens Theatre company's creative learning portfolio in early 2011. Previous Citizens productions directed by Hollands include "Hamlet", "Waiting For Godot", "Othello", "Beauty and the Beast", "The Caretaker", "Nightingale and Chase", "The Fever" and "Ice Cream Dreams", a ground breaking work which used community actors, people in recovery and professional actors to explore Glasgow's history during the "Glasgow Ice Cream Wars". Hollands' work for children and families for TAG and on tour includes Yellow Moon, " A Taste of Honey", "King Lear", "Knives in Hens", Liar, Museum of Dreams, "Meep and Moop" and The Monster in the Hall.

Jeremy Raison (2003-2010)
Jeremy Raison was the Artistic Director of the Citizens Theatre, Glasgow from 2003 until August 2010. After seven successful years Raison directed his final production A Clockwork Orange, based on Anthony Burgess's novel in October 2010. Previous Citizens productions directed by Raison include Thérèse Raquin, Baby Doll, A Handful of Dust, Desire Under the Elms and Ghosts as well as Scottish classics The Bevellers, No Mean City and his own adaptation of The Sound of My Voice based on the novel by Ron Butlin.
Raison's work for children and families in the Citizens includes The Borrowers, Charlotte's Web, James and the Giant Peach, Peter Pan, Cinderella and Wee Fairy Tales.

Producing theatre

The Citizens Theatre is the west of Scotland's major producing theatre. Approximately 30 members of staff work backstage during the run up to a production, in addition to which up to 12 actors for a main auditorium production and a director may be rehearsing in one of the theatre's three rehearsal rooms. The production team includes stage management, lighting, sound, workshop, wardrobe and technicians. Costumes, sets, lighting and sound are prepared by the Citizens' backstage crew and the company produces several shows each year in the main auditorium, studio spaces and for touring.

The Citizens Theatre is the only theatre in Scotland still to have the original Victorian machinery under the stage and the original Victorian paint frame is still used today to paint the backcloths for shows. Welding, carpentry, sewing, painting and papier-mâché may be used to create sets for productions.

Recently, Christmas shows have been fairy tales adapted by Alan McHugh and presented in highly theatrical productions offered as an alternative to pantomime.

Citizens Community Company and Citizens YOUNG Co.

Guy Hollands founded the Citizens Community Company in 1999, with the first Community Performance Project Driving Out The Devil, short plays by Bertolt Brecht, directed by Guy Hollands. Since this first evening, the company has presented 20 different productions, performing over 90 shows, and growing into a more or less permanent ensemble of around 30 people. The Community Company performs an annual A Wicked Christmas, showcasing the group's writing and acting talents, and taking an irreverent look at all things festive.

The Citizens YOUNG Co. launched in 2005. The company is drawn from young people in Glasgow and across the West of Scotland. No prior experience is required. Participants work on professional productions performed as part of the Citizens Theatre Season. YOUNG Co. members may study writing, performing, design or stage management and have the opportunity to work with theatre professionals.

Kids@Citz and Teenagers@Citz

The Citizens Theatre runs a programme of weekend drama classes for children and young people which sees over 250 participants attending the theatre most weekends. The classes are run by qualified drama tutors and are available for ages 4–15. At the end of each 10-week term, participants perform in one of the theatre's studio spaces for family and friends.

Kids@Citz (for ages 4–12) focuses on confidence building, social skills, encouraging children to use their creativity, and fun. Participants learn an array of drama games which build upon these skills and devise work to perform for family and friends.

In 2008 Kids@Citz participants performed as "munchkins" alongside professional actors in the Citizens Christmas show The Wizard of Oz. The production will be directed by Artistic Director Guy Hollands and designed by Jason Southgate.

Teenagers@Citz (ages 13–15) introduces participants to voice, movement and stagecraft; and encourages participants to devise work for performance. Teenagers@Citz have the opportunity to move on to the Citizens YOUNG Co. at age 16, and thus to work on main stage and studio shows within the theatre.

Citizens Theatre history
"The Citizens Theatre is probably more important as part of Britain's heritage than perhaps many imagined. It is Britain's oldest fully functioning professional theatre which retains the greater part of the historic auditorium and stage... This leaves the Grand Theatre, Leeds which opened six weeks before the Citizens (née Her Majesty's) but which had all its stage machinery destroyed 30 years ago. The Citizens is thus a British national treasure."- Iain MacIntosh, Theatre Specialist, November 2007.

 The theatre was built in 1878 (as Her Majesty's Theatre and Royal Opera House) and designed by leading architect James Sellars. It was one of 18 theatres built in Glasgow between 1862 and the outbreak of World War I in 1914 (during the same period seven were built in Edinburgh). It was the first theatre opened on the south side of Glasgow. Eventually there were four theatres built in the south side: The Palace, next door to the new theatre (now demolished), The Princess's Royal (formerly Her Majesty's, and now the Citizens), the Coliseum (now demolished), and the Lyceum in Govan . The remaining theatres built in this period still operating in Glasgow are the Pavilion Theatre, Glasgow, the King's Theatre, Glasgow, the Theatre Royal, Glasgow and the Citizens Theatre.

The theatre, and likewise its future Palace neighbour created in 1904 out of the Grand National Halls,  were built and owned by John Morrison as part of his development of tenements close to Gorbals Cross when the city was becoming the Second City of Empire. His building firm Morrison & Mason Ltd became one of the largest in the country, building the City Chambers, Stock Exchange, Queens Dock and much more. As Her Majesty's Theatre and Royal Opera House, he leased it to James F McFadyen, who had studied at Glasgow University and then became a lessee of theatres in England. The theatre seated 2,500, and presented plays, revues and pantomimes. Reflecting the quality of Morrison's work the new building was very safety conscious, substantially built; with fire hydrants on each level and on stage. The stairways were extremely wide and the lobbies spacious. Morrison commissioned sculptor John Mossman to create the six statues which adorned the roof line, above the classical columns of the facade.

A year later, in December 1879,  the lease changed to H Cecil Beryl who changed the name to the long running title of Royal Princess's Theatre For over twenty years the pantomimes staged by Beryl were written by Fred Locke. After seven years Beryl assumed a business partner Rich Waldon who would soon take over and buy the theatre from the builder. Waldon was also a writer and producer of pantomimes.

By 1914 Rich Waldon was the busiest theatre operator with five theatres in the city - the Royal Princess's, the Palace, the Lyceum in Govan, the Pavilion and the West End Playhouse/Empress 
On his death in 1922 he bequeathed the Royal Princess's to his deputy Harry McKelvie who as a boy had started as a bill poster for him and now was the mastermind behind each year's longest running pantomime in the United Kingdom. 1923 saw a major modernisation of the auditorium which was now fully carpeted and the walls finished in wood panelling.

Late each Spring each pantomime, having completed its long run in Gorbals,  would then tour round other venues in Scotland and England under McKelvie, who was also a shareholder and director of the Olympia Theatre, Bridgeton Cross. In the 1930s the next door neighbour variety-house the Palace was converted to a cinema and after television started it became a bingo hall.

When Harry McKelvie let it be known he was retiring in 1944 he offered a generous ten-year lease to the new Citizens Company, who took it up and moved from the Athenaeum Theatre in Buchanan Street. In 1946 Harry McKelvie died, his funeral being held in the theatre. Ar the end of the lease in 1955 Glasgow Corporation bought the theatre and leased it to the Citizens company.

The Citizens Theatre Company was formed in 1943 by a group of theatre-minded men led by Dr Tom Honeyman and James Bridie, one of Britain's leading playwrights. The name of the new company was taken from the manifesto of 1909 of Alfred Wareing's newly formed Scottish Playgoers Co Ltd for their repertory company, which was to provide live theatre for the citizens of Glasgow, staging new Scottish and international drama, opening at the Royalty Theatre. The 1909 manifesto of the Glasgow Repertory Theatre expressed these tenets: "The Repertory Theatre is Glasgow's own theatre. It is a citizens' theatre in the fullest sense of the term. Established to make Glasgow independent from London for its dramatic supplies, it produces plays which the Glasgow playgoers would otherwise not have the opportunity of seeing."

Originally based at the Athenaeum Theatre in Buchanan Street, Bridie's Citizens Company relocated to the Royal Princess's Theatre in the Gorbals in 1945 at the invitation of Harry McKelvie, "The Pantomime King". Bridie renamed it the Citizens Theatre and the Citizens Company opened there on 11 September 1945.

James Bridie
James Bridie, the main pseudonym used by Dr Osborne Henry Mavor, was a leading British playwright of international status, screenwriter and physician. During his medical career, his first play was produced in 1928 in Glasgow. He is a founding father of modern Scottish theatre, reflecting his creation of the Citizens Theatre, appointment as the first chairman of the Scottish committee of the Arts Council, and inaugurator of Scotland's first College of Drama in 1950, now part of the Royal Conservatoire of Scotland in Glasgow. He was instrumental in establishing the Edinburgh Festival.

He studied medicine at the University of Glasgow, then served as a medical officer during World War I in France and Mesopotamia. He became a senior consulting physician at the Victoria Infirmary and Professor of Medicine at Anderson's College.  With the success of his comedies in London, Bridie became a full-time writer in 1938. The Bridie Library in Glasgow University Union, an organisation of which he was president, is named after him. The Citizens became immensely popular and had full houses, including school audiences and touring to communities, and staged a wide selection of productions in its first 25 years.

Innovation and growth 
From inception, the Citizens Theatre company was a full-time professional company. The first managing director was novelist Guy McCrone assisted by his wife and soon after that the post was held by George Singleton of cinema fame. One of the first business managers was Winifred Savile formerly producer and manageress of Perth Theatre which had been created by her father J.H. Savile. By coincidence, her uncle, H.Cecil Beryl was lessee of the Royal Princess's Theatre from 1879 to 1887. The board of directors included R.W.Greig, chairman of the Scottish National Orchestra, Norman Duthie, chartered accountant, and Sir John Boyd, lawyer.

Following upon the first year in Buchanan street, which washed its face financially and the second year there which made a small profit, the first year 1945/46 in the larger and more comfortable theatre on the south-side attracted all its Athenaeum customers and a further 5,000 new patrons. Playwrights in the Citizens in its first year were: JB Priestley, Robert McLellan, Paul Vincent Carroll, James Bridie, Patrick Griffin, John Wilson, JM Barrie, Peter Ustinov, Robert Kemp, Bernard Shaw, Somerset Maugham, Anna LLouise Romoff, Gordon Daviot, Robins Millar, Gordon Bottomley and Moray McLaren. Seven of the productions were premieres.

In its first 21 years the Citizens presented nearly 300 plays, of which 72 were British or world premieres.

Production and art directors from 1943 to 1964 include :  Eric Capon, Jennifer Sounes, Edmund Bacley, Matthew Forsyth, John Casson, James Gibson, Kenneth Mackintosh, Denis Carey, Michael Finlayson, Sir Tyrone Guthrie, Peter Potter, Alastair Sim, Colin Chandler, Richard Mathews, Fulton Mackay, Peter Duguid, Iain Cuthbertson, Albert Finney, Piers Hagard and Eric Jones. Michael Blakemore was especially associated with the company, first working there as an actor in 1966–67, where his parts included George in Who's Afraid of Virginia Woolf? and Maitland in Inadmissible Evidence. After this Blakemore turned to directing, becoming co-director in 1968 after his great success with Peter Nichols A Day in the Death of Joe Egg (1967), which transferred to London that year and to Broadway in 1968. 

In the 1960s Glasgow Corporation decided to plan the construction of a new Theatre and Concert Hall in the city centre.  This eventually emerged in the late 1980s as the Glasgow International Concert Hall, at the top of Buchanan Street, but without the envisaged theatre. The Citizens remain in its Gorbals site.

The 1969–2003 triumvirate
During the period from the 1970s to the 1990s, the Citizens was associated with innovative play selections and stagings by Giles Havergal, Philip Prowse and Robert David MacDonald. The three were responsible for the Citizens Theatre being again recognised as one of the leading theatres in Britain. Havergal and Prowse came from the Watford Palace Theatre in 1969. By 1971 Robert David MacDonald completed the triumvirate. Their internationalist approach was some distance from the original vision of a national theatre but did meet the access aspirations of the 1909 manifesto, not least in a commitment to low pricing.

Giles Havergal
Giles Havergal was Director of Watford Palace Theatre (1965–69) and director of the Citizens Theatre from 1969 to 2003. He directed over 80 plays in Glasgow including works by Shakespeare and Bertolt Brecht. He has also directed over 20 children and family Christmas productions. Havergal's production of Travels with My Aunt adapted from the Graham Greene novel of the same title, was first presented in Glasgow in 1989 and then played in the West End where it won a Laurence Olivier Award in 1993, and off Broadway in 1995. His production of his and Robert David Macdonald's adaptation of Death in Venice by Thomas Mann was first presented in Glasgow in 2000. It played at the Manhattan Ensemble Theatre, New York in 2002.

Philip Prowse
Philip Prowse was trained at the Slade School of Art and since 1970 was a Co-Director of the Citizens Company with Havergal and Robert David MacDonald. In 2003 both Havergal and MacDonald stepped down from their posts as directors of the company. Prowse however, continued his role as artistic collaborator with newly appointed Artistic Director, Jeremy Raison, until 2004. He directed and designed over 70 plays with the Citizens Theatre and has worked throughout the world designing and directing for opera, ballet and drama.

Robert David MacDonald
Robert David MacDonald became a Co-Director of the Citizens Company with Havergal and Philip Prowse in 1971 and retired in June 2003. In that time he wrote and adapted fourteen plays for the company: Dracula (1972); Camille (1974); De Sade Show (1975); Chinchilla (1977); No Orchids for Miss Blandish (1978); Summit Conference (1978); A Waste of Time (1980); Don Juan (1980); Webster (1983); Anna Karenina (1987); Conundrum (1992); In Quest of Conscience (1994); Persons Unknown (1995); The Ice House (1998), Britannicus (2002), Cheri (2003) and Snow White (2003). As an actor with the Citizens Company he played leading roles in more than twenty productions. He translated over sixty plays and operas from ten languages and as a director with the company he directed fifty productions including ten British or world premieres. Robert David MacDonald died in 2004.

1970s controversies
During the 1970s the Citizens started to attract controversy with its productions and advertising.

In December 1970 city councillors called for an end to the £12,000 annual grant the Glasgow Corporation gave to the theatre after it was announced that anyone presenting a trade union card on 8 December would be granted free entry to the theatre. The Evening Times reported "The free tickets were suggested as a gesture of the actors' solidarity with the trade unionists' strike protest against the Industrial Relations Bill" (Evening Times, 7 December 1970). This was the first of many altercations between the theatre and the city council throughout the decade.

Earlier in the autumn season of 1970 a controversial new staging of Hamlet caused outrage in the press for the nudity and alternative acting styles of the company. The Scotsman headline reported "Hamlet Depicted As A Gibbering Oaf" (7 September 1970) but the public flocked to the production and the theatre discovered an all new audience. Cordelia Oliver, a longterm supporter of the Citizens in her reviews, noted in The Guardian "Schoolchildren en masse rarely sit "Hamlet" out in silence, nor are they often roused to cheering as they did at the end last Friday. If Havergal has set his sights on a predominately youthful audience for the Citizens this reception suggest he may not be so wide off the mark" (10 September 1970).

In 1975 a flier advertising the spring season was condemned by Labour councillor Laurence McGarry for its depiction of "Shakespeare, in drag with large cleavage, painted lips, corsets, suspenders and hand on hip". The councilor felt the theatre was guilty of "playing to an intellectual minority rather than the great mass of the public".

In 1977 the Lord Provost Mr Peter McCann called for the sacking of theatre bosses after a performance of Dracula which featured nude scenes he described as "kinky claptrap appealing only to mentally ill weirdos" (Sunday Express, 13 March 1977). The Provost's calls were not supported by his councillors and his attempts to gain city council control of programming at the Citizens failed. The entire run of Dracula at the Citizens was a sell-out.

Throughout its later existence the Citizens has been both criticised and acclaimed for its insistence on producing works which are not specifically populist, although heavily subsidised from public funds. While many have claimed that a citizens' theatre should deliberately appeal to a mass audience the theatre has a history of experimental works which have gained notice despite rather than because of their subject matter.

Rebuilding works
Following a fire, an order was made with little warning for the destruction of the Palace Bingo Hall (née Theatre) in 1977. Staff of the Citizens arranged a stay of execution to rescue the best of the Victorian fittings, including the six statues which stood atop the columns. Following these works, almost the entire tenement block which had sat in front of the auditorium was razed, leaving the Citizens' foyer as the only remaining piece In an article for the Guardian newspaper, Bunny Christie described the theatre in this period as "[sitting] on its own, surrounded by potholes and puddles, everything else seemed to have been pulled down."

This state of affairs lasted until 1988, when the remaining foyer and bars were torn down as part of a new development on Gorbals Street by Strathclyde Regional Council, which included a new foyer and bars for the theatre. During the reconstruction, a limited "in the round" theatre operated on the stage behind the safety curtain, accessed via a temporary foyer located at an emergency exit with a capacity of 250. The main theatre was reopened for the Christmas show, in slightly makeshift fashion due to uncompleted works, as it had been identified as essential to the Company's finances.

The new foyer, fronted in glass and yellow brick, opened in 1989 and lasted until its demolition, which began in September 2019. Further works throughout the 1990s included the creation of two studio theatres in 1991-92; office space on the north side in 1996-1998 which also included a new rehearsal room, scene dock, front-of house offices and lift access with National Lottery funding 

As part of the 2019-onward works, delayed somewhat by the COVID-19 pandemic, the south and west of the building, including the 1989 foyer, were demolished completely with the intention to rebuild both front and back-of-house facilities. During these works, the theatre closed completely, with shows from the Company taking place at Tramway and projects at Scotland Street School Museum (both COVID-19 restrictions permitting) in the meantime.

Foyer statues
Inside the Citizens foyer from 1977 were four elephant statues and four Nautch girls' statues, all in the baroque Anglo-Indian style, a reminder of the re-design of the adjacent Palace Theatre in 1907 by Bertie Crewe. The remaining two elephants and two more Nautch girls (or goddesses) can now be found in the Theatre Museum in London.

The foyer also features statues representing William Shakespeare, Robert Burns and four muses, music, dance, tragedy and comedy, which were originally placed on the roof of the Royal Princess's Theatre and are the work of Victorian Glasgow sculptor John Mossman. The four muses are Music (Euterpe), Comedy (Thalia), Tragedy (Melpomene) and Dance (Terpsichore).

The six pillars on which they sat were once the front of the Union Bank on Ingram Street. The statues were brought down from the building after nearly a hundred years on 12 July 1977 in order to protect them from demolition work taking place at nearby Gorbals Cross. The six statues will re-emerge on the roofline of the theatre once completed, likely now in 2023.

Ghost stories
Over time, many patrons and staff members have reported sightings of ghosts. One long term staff member, trapped in the upper circle during a blackout, was led to safety by the distinctive outline of a monk. Customers seated in the dress circle during shows in the 1970s often inquired about the costumed "actor" who sat boldly on the balcony and stared back at them. Current staff members have caught glimpses of a "white lady" dressed in Victorian costume and flitting (moving) from the dress circle bar towards the circle studio dressing rooms. Backstage dressing room 7 is thought to be haunted by some of its past inhabitants and the upper circle has occasional visits from a strawberry seller girl, one of the most sighted of the Citizens ghosts.

Citizens Theatre alumni
Amongst those who have trod the boards at the Citizens Theatre or worked backstage are Pierce Brosnan, Steven Berkoff, Ciarán Hinds, Rupert Everett, Helen Baxendale, Tim Roth, Celia Imrie, Mark Rylance, Laurance Rudic, Lorcan Cranitch, Tim Curry, Laura Briggs Sean Bean, Una McLean, Ann Mitchell, Alan Rickman, Andrew Bunton, Glenda Jackson, David Yelland Greg Hicks, David Hayman, Iain Robertson, Petriece O'Donnell, Henry Ian Cusick, Robbie Coltrane, Stanley Baxter, Molly Urquhart, Allison McKenzie, Duncan Macrae, Fulton Mackay, Emily Murphy, Jonathan Watson, Gary Oldman, Olivia Hughes, Leonard Maguire, Fidelis Morgan, Colette 'Saboteur' Marshall, Moira Shearer, Julie Le Grand, Andrew Keir, Sophie Ward, Roberta Taylor, Lewis Collins, Sam Heughan, Karen Fishwick and Trisha Biggar (who designed the costumes for Star Wars: Episode I – The Phantom Menace, Star Wars: Episode II – Attack of the Clones and Star Wars: Episode III – Revenge of the Sith), was for very many years, wardrobe mistress. Renowned designer/directors, as well as Philip Prowse, include Kenny Miller, Stewart Laing, Nigel Lowery, Tom Cairns, Antony McDonald and designers Sue Blane, Michael Levine, Maria Bjornson, David Fielding etc. Rae Smith worked as a scene painter.Clara Geoghegan danced on the original The Royal Princess's Theatre stage

TAG Theatre Company alumni
A number of high-profile actors have worked for TAG Theatre Company, including Robert Carlyle, Bill Paterson, Alex Norton, Alan Cumming, Blythe Duff, Forbes Masson, Caroline Paterson, Billy Boyd, and Jonathan Watson.

Bibliography
 James Bridie and His Theatre, by Winifred Bannister (Savile), published 1955.
 The Citizens Theatre 21st Anniversary Conspectus, published 1964.
 The Citizens Theatre to the Present Day, by Tony Paterson, published 1970.
 Dr Mavor and Mr Bridie, by his son Dr Ronald Mavor, published in 1988.
 Magic in the Gorbals, A Personal Record of the Citizen's Theatre, by Cordelia Oliver, published 1999.

References

External links

 The Citizens Theatre, 119 Gorbals Street, Glasgow
 
 GLASGOW CITIZENS THEATRE (c.1972) (archive film from the National Library of Scotland: SCOTTISH SCREEN ARCHIVE)
It is possible to look around the three theatre spaces, three rehearsal rooms and the foyer of the Citizens Theatre using the 360-degree virtual tours on the Citizens Theatre website:
 Virtual Tours

Theatres in Glasgow
Category B listed buildings in Glasgow
Gorbals
Producing theatres in Scotland
Arts organisations based in Scotland
1943 establishments in Scotland
Socialism in Scotland